Slime is an extreme leftwing German punk rock band founded in Hamburg in 1979. They developed upon the straightforward style of late 70's British punk to create complex song structures with layered and cryptic texts, becoming one of the defining bands of the 1980s German punk scene.

During their growing success, Slime became the subject of controversy as they were accused of "selling out".

The band has dissolved and reunited twice from 1984-2009; often coming back together to address rising social issues (e.g. Hoyerswerda riots, Rostock-Lichtenhagen riots) with great commercial success and continue to produce music to the present day.

History

Michael "Elf" Mayer and Sven "Eddie" Räther both attended Gymnasium Heidberg in Langenhorn, Hamburg. Both discovered their love for punk rock through the Ramones' first album and decided to found a band. Mayer played guitar and Räther played bass, and the harbor worker Peter "Ball" Wodok played drums. The first vocalist was Thorsten "Scout" Kolle, a classmate of Mayer and Räther. First appearing under the name "Slime 79 and the Sewer Army", which was soon shortened to "Slime". The first song written by the band was "Polizei SA/SS", a reaction to the police actions against anti-nuclear protests. The band made their first appearance in the youth center Kiwittsmoor, appearing with The Kreislaufkollaps. Their singer Dirk Jora impressed the band, which replaced Kolle with Jora.

The band recorded their first EP, Wir wollen keine Bullenschweine ("We don't want any fucking cops"), which was released in February 1980, followed by their first album, Slime I (1981). The album also contained a copy of the song "Wir wollen keine Bullenschweine", which attracted the attention of the Hamburg public prosecutor. Charges for "Volksverhetzung" ("incitement to hatred") were filed and dropped.

While their songs in the beginning featured simple riffing and rather stereotypic anarchist sloganeering, music and lyrics became darker and more complex by the third album "Alle Gegen Alle".

Notable songs are "Deutschland muss Sterben (...damit wir leben können)" ("Germany must die (... so we can live)"), an allusion to "Deutschland muß leben, und wenn wir sterben müssen" (Germany must live, even if we must die), a line of the 1914 poem Soldatenabschied by the German poet Heinrich Lersch, "Bullenschweine" (literally cop swines), "Polizei SA/SS" (police SA/SS), comparing police to the SA and SS and "A.C.A.B." ("All Cops Are Bastards").

They sang anti-war songs (e.g. "We Don't Need the Army"), and they made a punk anthem with the song "Hey Punk". They even produced songs against their government ("They Don't Give a Fuck"), their justice ("Gerechtigkeit" - "Justice"), their police and their politicians ("Sand im Getriebe"). The song "Yankees Raus" (Yankees out) is against imperialism.

The following years, neo-fascism in Germany was rising more and more, so they felt dutybound to sing against them. While their 1992 comeback album "Viva La Muerte" was a rather sketchy affair, their 1994 album "Schweineherbst" (Autumn Of Swines) is by many seen as their masterpiece, musically as well as lyrically.

The chilling song "der Tod ist ein Meister aus Deutschland" (Death is a master from Germany) was inspired by the poem Todesfuge (lit. "Death Fugue") by Paul Celan, who was a prisoner in different Nazi concentration camps during the Holocaust and described the horrors he had experienced there.

The band reunited in 2009 and released the album Sich fügen heißt lügen ("To submit is to lie") in 2012, followed by Hier und jetzt ("Here and now") in 2017.

The band's anti-police songs "are still anthems of the leftist movement" to this day.

Discography 

 1981: Slime I (no label, banned)
 1982: Yankees raus (AGR)
 1983: Alle gegen Alle (AGR)
 1992: Viva la Muerte (AGR/Modern Music)
 1994: Schweineherbst (Indigo)
 2012: Sich fügen heißt lügen (People Like You/EMI)
 2017: Hier und jetzt (People Like You)
 2020: Wem gehört die Angst  (Arising Empire)

Live and compilations 
 1984: Live (AGR)
 1990: Compilation 81–87 (Bitzcore)
 1990: Die Letzten (AGR)
 1995: Live Punk Club (Große Freiheit in Hamburg) (Slime)

Singles 
 1980: "Wir wollen keine Bullenschweine" (Moderne Musik)
 1993: "Der Tod ist ein Meister aus Deutschland / Schweineherbst" (Weserlabel/Indigo)
 1993: "10 Kleine Nazischweine" (mit Heiter bis Wolkig), two-track-EP

Tribute album 
 2009: Alle gegen Alle – A Tribute to Slime (Toten Hosen, Rasta Knast, Dritte Wahl, etc.)

DVDs 
 2004: Wenn der Himmel brennt

References

External links 

German punk rock groups
Deutschpunk
Musical groups from Hamburg
Musical groups established in 1979
Musical groups established in 2009
Musical groups disestablished in 1984
Musical groups disestablished in 1994
Musical groups established in 1990